Elyasvand may refer to:
 Elyasvand-e Olya
 Elyasvand-e Sofla